"Wish You Were Sober" is a song by American singer-songwriter Conan Gray. It was released on March 18, 2020 by Republic Records as the fifth single from his debut studio album Kid Krow. The song was written by Conan Gray and Dan Nigro.

Background
The song addresses the mistakes of Gray's teenage years, and acknowledges that "moments from young adult life aren't always remembered." The song focuses on a specific incident where Gray's love interest would confess their love for him whilst "black out drunk". The song was described as "the most straightforward pop song" on the album, and was praised by E! for its "confessional lyrics and the excellent alt-pop production."

Music video
A music video to accompany the release of "Wish You Were Sober" was first released on YouTube on March 20, 2020. The video was directed by BRUME. The video was released with the album and gained over 400 thousand views in 48 hours.

Composition and lyrics 
On Apple Music Editor's Notes under Gray's album Kid Krow, Gray writes that "It's ["Wish You Were Sober"] a song that I ended up sticking on the album last minute ’cause it was so much fun when I was making it. I wrote it about this person who I really, really liked and I wrote a lot of songs on my album about them and they just wouldn't tell me that they liked me back or would never tell me their true feelings unless they were blackout drunk. It was a weird, bittersweet feeling, because on one side you're thinking, ‘Yay, they like me and they have feelings for me and they like me back.’ On the other side you're thinking, ‘Why can't you tell me this when you're sober? Why can't you tell me this in daylight?’ I think the song is about all those mixed emotions and all the craziness behind being young and getting super drunk and calling someone and telling them that you love them.”

Critical reception 
The song received positive reviews from music critics, who praised the lyrics and production.  

Taylor Swift praised Gray's "Wish You Were Sober" on her Instagram story claiming that it was her favorite song off Gray's debut album. Swift stated “Obsessed with this whole album. but this song ["Wish You Were Sober"] right here is a masterpiece. Not trying to be loud but this will be on repeat for my whole life. Volume all the way up.”

Helen Ehrlich from Affinity Magazine declared that "'Wish You Were Sober' is the song that plays in a coming of age film after the main character completely claims their identity. 'Wish You Were Sober' is the sensation of bursting out of a party, onto the front porch and out into the cool night. 'Wish You Were Sober' is a breath of fresh air."

Credits and personnel
Credits adapted from Tidal.
 Dan Nigro – producer, composer, lyricist, associated performer, bass, drum programming, electric guitar, engineer, keyboards, mix engineer, studio personnel, synthesizer
 Conan Gray – composer, lyricist, associated performer, background vocalist, vocals
 Serban Ghenea – mixer, studio personnel
 John Hanes – studio personnel

Charts

Release history

References

2020 songs
2020 singles
Conan Gray songs
Songs about alcohol
Songs written by Dan Nigro